Fountainea nobilis, the noble leafwing, is a species of Neotropical butterfly belonging to the family Nymphalidae, Charaxinae subfamily.

Description
Fountainea nobilis is a quite rare "leaf butterfly". The dorsal sides of the upperwings are reddish with dark brown edges. In the females the dorsal sides are usually brown, with clearer edges. On the hindwings there are a few small white and black eyespots. The undersides mimic dead leaves, ranging from pale brown to grey.

Distribution
Fountainea nobilis can be found from Southern Mexico (south-western Chiapas) to Colombia, Venezuela and Peru.

Subspecies
 F. n. nobilis - Guatemala
 F. n. titan (C. & R. Felder, [1867]) - Costa Rica, Colombia, Peru 
 F. n. caudata (Röber, 1916) - Colombia
 F. n. peralta (Hall, 1929) - Costa Rica
 F. n. rayoensis (Maza & Díaz, 1978) - Mexico (Oaxaca)
 F. n. romeroi (Descimon, 1988) – Venezuela

References

 Biolib
 World Field Guide

External links
 Butterflies of America
 Pteron Images. In Japanese but with binomial name
 Butterflies of America

Charaxinae
 
Nymphalidae of South America
Butterflies described in 1864
Butterflies of North America
Taxa named by Henry Walter Bates